Established in 1972, Drug Metabolism Reviews is an academic journal that publishes review articles on all aspects of drug metabolism research. It is   the official journal of the International Society for the Study of Xenobiotics (ISSX).

The journal is published by Informa. Jack A. Hinson, Professor and Director of the Division of Toxicology at University of Arkansas for Medical Sciences, serves as its editor-in-chief.

Core areas 

Topics covered include:

 Established, new and potential drugs
 Environmentally toxic chemicals
 Absorption
 Metabolism and excretion
 Enzymology, including all living species.

Publication format 

The journal  publishes 4 issues per year in simultaneous print and online editions. All back-issues of the journal are available online and are hosted on the publisher's website.

Impact factor 

According to ISI it received an impact factor of 5.356 as reported in the 2014 Journal Citation Reports by Thomson Reuters, ranking it 16th out of 254 journals in the category “Pharmacology & Pharmacy”.

References

External links
journal homepage
Homepage of the International Society for the Study of Xenobiotics

Publications established in 1972
Pharmaceutical sciences
Pharmacology journals
English-language journals